The Nigerian Society of Engineers (NSE) is an umbrella organization for engineers in Nigeria. It was founded on 16 February 1958 by a group of young Nigerian Graduate Engineers and students in the United Kingdom and inaugurated at the Nigerian House in London.

NSE is registered with the Corporate Affairs Commission as a company limited by guarantee.

Objectives 
The objects for which the Society is established are:

 To provide a central organisation for engineers in Nigeria and to generally to such things as may for time to time be necessary to maintain a strict standard or professional ethics among its members and to advance the interest of the engineering profession in Nigeria.
 To promote, protect, encourage and maintain a high standard of engineering study and practice and to encourage greater efficiency therein.
 To present to the Government of Nigeria the views of the Society on any subject of concern or interest to engineers in Nigeria and if considered advisable to join with any other bodies in submitting such representation.
 To represent to any other individual or bodies or organisation the views of the society on any subject of concern or interest to engineers in Nigeria or any appropriate subject on which the views of the Society may be invited.
 To provide a body to which the Government or other official or unofficial authority or organisation in Nigeria can have recourse for advice, assistance or the expression of views on any subjects of concern or interest to engineers in Nigeria.
 To facilitate the development and acquisition of technology by conducting visits to places of engineering interest, reading technical papers, holding meetings, conferences, publishing books journals and periodicals on engineering matters.
 To subscribe or guarantee or otherwise use monies of the Society for charitable or benevolent objects or scholarships on bursaries or for any exhibitions for any public general or useful objects.
 To provide for the training and examination of students in engineering as well as the continuing professional update and development of its members.
 To nominate any member of members as arbitrators, panelists, investigators, auditors expert witnesses or specialist advisers, when called upon to do so.
 To assist necessitous members and any of the dependent kindred of deceased members including the widows and widowers of members and to appoint treasurer and distributor of any benevolent fund or funds which may be contributed by members or others for these purposes or any of them and subject to the provisions of paragraph four (prohibiting payments being made to members), to make any contributions out of the surplus assets or income of the Society from time to time to any benevolent fund or funds.
 To purchase, hold, lease, let, mortgage, sell, improve, or otherwise acquire and dispose of any movable or immovable property and any rights or privileges, which may be necessary or convenient for the advancement of any of the objects of the Society.
 To invest and deal with the monies of the Society not immediately required in any manner.
 To borrow money where necessary to promote any of the objects set out herein upon such securities as may be determined.
 To apply or petition for any legislation, parliamentary or otherwise that would further any of the objects of the Societies.
 To do all or any such Lawful things as are incidental or conducive to the attainment of the object and generally to further the profession of engineering in Nigeria as well as enhance the status of engineers in Nigeria. Provided that the Society shall not support with its funds and objects nor endeavour to impose on or procure to be observed by its members or others any regulation, restriction or condition which if an object of the Society would make it a trade union.
 To maintain and enhance links with national, international and multinational organizations and bodies to promote any of the objects of the Society.
 To collaborate with Industry, Commence, Academia, and other such national bodies as may be necessary or convenient for the advancement of any of the objects of the Society.
 To promote and enforce a high standard of performance and professional ethics among its members.
 To promote and enforce a high standard of performance and professional ethics among its members.
 To watch over, promote, and protect the mutual interests of its members and to give advice to members..

Governance
The society has a President, Deputy President, 3 Vice Presidents and 6 other Executive Committee members. The current President is Engr. Babagana Mohammed, FNSE who was elected  and sworn in as its 32nd President.

Mayen Adetiba, a Civil Engineer, a past President of the Association of Consulting Engineers of Nigeria (ACEN) was the first woman to be elected into the Executive Committee of NSE, who also rose to become a Vice-President of the Society.

Structure and Leadership 
The President of the Society is the Chief Executive, and directs the programme and mandate of the Society on behalf of the members. The President is the Chairman at every General Meeting, meeting of the Council and Executive Committee of the Society. The President holds for a period of two years and is succeeded by the Deputy President. The Deputy President is elected every two years, who automatically becomes the President after the expiration of the two-year tenure of the predecessor.

The council is the governing body of the Society. The Council meets bi-monthly to consider memo from the executive committee and others to make policies touching on the conduct and business of the Society. The council is made up of statutory members and reports to the Annual General Meeting which is an expanded gathering of members once every year.

The Executive Committee (EXCO) of the Society is responsible for overseeing the management and administration of the affairs of the Society and reports to Council of the Society. EXCO is made up of the President, Deputy President, Vice Presidents, members who were elected by other members at the Annual General Meetings every year and nominated representatives of the Divisions.

The Secretariat of the Society is staffed by professionals with different skills and discipline. The Secretariat implements policies of the Society and the overall co-ordination of its activities. The Executive Secretary is the head of the Secretariat and oversees the day-to-day management of the Secretariat. The National Engineering Centre NEC Abuja houses the Secretariat.

The society has established numerous branches in both Nigeria and the UK.

Membership 
There are six grades of membership in NSE. They include:

 Student member
 Graduate member
 Corporate member
 Associate
 Fellow
 Honorary fellow

Publication 
NSE official journal publication is The Nigerian engineer. It also publishes conference proceedings, technical paper and inaugural lectures.

Past Presidents 
List of Past Presidents of NSE

National Engineering Center (NEC) 
The National Engineering Center (NEC) Abuja was commissioned on Thursday 26 July 2007. The commissioning ceremony was performed by the former president of the Federal Republic of Nigeria, Engr. Chief Olusegun Obasanjo, FNSE, GCFR. The Nigerian Society of Engineers (NSE) applied for the allocation of a plot of land in Central Area of Abuja in August 1980 to build the National Engineering Centre (NEC) Abuja during the tenure of past President of NSE Engr. O. Olugbekan, FNSE. The foundation laying ceremony was performed by General I. B. Babaginda GCFR, the then President of Nigeria in December 1992.

Divisions 

The following Divisions exist in NSE:

Aeronautical

Agricultural

Appraisers and Cost Engineers

APWEN

Automotive

Chemical

Civil

Electrical

Environment

Facility

Geotechnical

Highway

Industrial

Institute of Communication Engineers

Marine Engr & Naval Architecture

Mechanical

Metallurgical, Mining and Materials

Petroleum

Polymer

Power

Procurement

Safety

Space

Structural

Water

Key people
Margaret Oguntala

References

External links 

Engineering societies
Professional associations based in Nigeria
1958 establishments in Nigeria
Organizations established in 1958